Lori Ann Trahan (Loureiro; born October 27, 1973) is an American businesswoman and politician serving as the U.S. representative for  since 2019. The district covers Boston's northwestern suburbs, and includes Lowell, Lawrence, Concord, and Trahan's hometown, Westford. A Democrat, she formerly served as chief of staff to Representative Marty Meehan in Massachusetts's 5th congressional district.

Early life and education 
Trahan was born on October 27, 1973, and raised in Lowell, Massachusetts. She grew up with three sisters. Trahan attended Lowell High School, into whose Sports Hall of Fame she was later inducted. Trahan has said her family lived "paycheck to paycheck". Her father, Tony Loureiro, had Portuguese parents. His father was from Porto, and his mother was born in Brazil to Portuguese parents and moved to the Azores to live with relatives as a child after her mother's death. Trahan's mother is also of partial Portuguese ancestry (from the Azores).

At Lowell High, Trahan earned an athletic scholarship in volleyball to Georgetown University. She graduated from Georgetown's Walsh School of Foreign Service with a bachelor's degree in comparative and regional studies in international relations.

Earlier career 
After college, Trahan worked for Marty Meehan, the U.S. Representative for Massachusetts's 5th congressional district, eventually becoming his chief of staff. In 2005, she left the public sector to work for ChoiceStream, a Cambridge, Massachusetts-based marketing software company. She became the CEO of the Concire Leadership Institute, a small, woman-owned consulting firm.

U.S. House of Representatives

Elections

2018 

In October 2017, Trahan announced her candidacy for the 2018 election to succeed retiring U.S. Representative Niki Tsongas. Tsongas had succeeded Trahan's former boss, Meehan, in a 2007 special election (the district was renumbered as the 3rd district after the 2010 census).

In September 2018, Trahan won the Democratic primary election, the real contest in this heavily Democratic district, narrowly defeating Daniel Koh, the former chief of staff to Boston Mayor Marty Walsh, in a field of 10 candidates. The victory was upheld after a recount. In the November general election, Trahan defeated the Republican nominee, Rick Green, with 62% of the vote.

2020 

Trahan was reelected with 97% of the vote in 2020, running unopposed.

Tenure

Campaign finance investigation
On March 4, 2019, The Boston Globe published an analysis of contributions to Trahan's campaign in the weeks before the 3rd congressional district's 2018 Democratic primary. In the last days before the primary, Trahan put hundreds of thousands of dollars into TV advertising, and the Globe investigated the source of the money. Trahan told the Globe she used $371,000 in personal funds, but federal financial disclosures she filed in the late summer of 2018 appeared to show that she did not have the funds to cover such a loan.

On December 17, 2019, the United States House Committee on Ethics launched a continuing investigation of Trahan after congressional investigators found "substantial reason to believe" that she violated campaign finance laws in her 2018 campaign. The Ethics Committee voted unanimously to dismiss the inquiry on July 15, 2020, saying in its final report that it "did not find that Representative Trahan acted in violation of House Rules, laws, regulations, or other standards of conduct."

Committee assignments 
 Committee on Armed Services
 Subcommittee on Intelligence, Emerging Threats and Capabilities
 Subcommittee on Military Personnel
 Committee on Education and Labor
 Subcommittee on Health, Employment, Labor, and Pensions
 Subcommittee on Higher Education and Workforce Investment

Caucus memberships 
 Congressional Hispanic Caucus
 Congressional Progressive Caucus
New Democrat Coalition

Electoral history

Political positions
In April 2019, Trahan supported the presidential candidacy of Senator Elizabeth Warren.

In an April 2019 interview, Trahan said she did not support the impeachment of President Trump, but that Congress should continue investigating Trump. In December 2019, after the revelation that Trump had spoken to Ukrainian President Volodymyr Zelensky about investigating his rival Joe Biden, Trahan told The Salem News that she supported impeaching the president, calling Trump's abuses in office a "clear and present danger" that required action. On December 19, 2019, Trahan voted for both articles of impeachment against Trump.

On October 1, 2020, Trahan co-signed a letter to Secretary of State Mike Pompeo condemning Azerbaijan’s offensive operations against the Armenian-populated enclave of Nagorno-Karabakh and denounced Turkey’s role in the Nagorno-Karabakh conflict, and criticized "false equivalence between Armenia and Azerbaijan, even as the latter threatens war and refuses to agree to monitoring along the line of contact."

On March 28, 2019, Trahan voted to protect transgender troops from the Trump Administration's ban on transgender people serving in the military.

On February 7, 2019, Trahan became an original cosponsor of the Green New Deal.

In October 2022, Trahan introduced the Stop Online Suicide Assistance Forums Act, a bill that would make it a crime to use "the mail or interstate communication to intentionally assist another individual in taking that individual's own life". The bill was a bipartisan effort that included Representatives Chris Stewart, Mike Carey and Katie Porter.

In January 2023, Trahan was one of 13 cosponsors of an amendment to the Constitution of the United States extending the right to vote to citizens sixteen years of age or older.

Syria
In 2023, Trahan was among 56 Democrats to vote in favor of H.Con.Res. 21, which directed President Joe Biden to remove U.S. troops from Syria within 180 days.

Personal life
Trahan lives in Westford, Massachusetts, with her two daughters, three stepsons, and husband Dave. She is Roman Catholic.

See also
 List of Hispanic and Latino Americans in the United States Congress
 Women in the United States House of Representatives

References

External links 

 Congresswoman Lori Trahan official U.S. House website
 Lori Trahan for Congress

|-

1973 births
21st-century American politicians
21st-century American women politicians
American people of Azorean descent
American politicians of Brazilian descent
American Roman Catholics
Democratic Party members of the United States House of Representatives from Massachusetts
Female members of the United States House of Representatives
Catholics from Massachusetts
Georgetown Hoyas women's volleyball players
Living people
Politicians from Lowell, Massachusetts
People from Westford, Massachusetts
Political chiefs of staff
United States congressional aides
Women in Massachusetts politics